Sarpang District (Dzongkha: གསར་སྤང་རྫོང་ཁག་; Wylie: Gsar-spang rdzong-khag; also known as "Geylegphug") is one of the 20 dzongkhags (districts) comprising Bhutan. Sarpang covers a total area of 1,946 sq km and stretches from Lhamoizhingkha in West Bhutan to Manas National Park in the east. Sarpang Dzongkhag is divided into one dungkhag, Gelephu, and 12 gewogs.

Languages
The dominant language in Sarpang is Nepali, an Indo-European language spoken by the heterogeneous Lhotshampa community. The East Bodish Kheng language is also spoken in the northeastern reaches of the district.

Administrative divisions
Sarpang District is currently divided into twelve village blocks (or gewogs):

Chhuzagang Gewog
Chhudzom Gewog
Dekiling Gewog
Gakiling Gewog
Gelephu Gewog
Jigmechhoeling Gewog
Samtenling Gewog
Senghe Gewog
Serzhong Gewog
Shompangkha Gewog
Tareythang Gewog
Umling Gewog

Environment
Much of Sarpang District consists of environmentally protected areas. Far western Sarpang District (the gewog of Senghe) contains part of the uninhabited Phibsoo Wildlife Sanctuary along the India border; northern Sarpang District (the gewog of Jigmechhoeling) is part of Jigme Singye Wangchuck National Park; eastern and southeastern Sarpang District (the gewogs of Jigmechhoeling, Tareythang and Umling) lie within Royal Manas National Park. Sarpang is bisected by a wide swath of biological corridor connecting all three environmentally protected areas.

History
On April 26, 2007, Lhamoy Zingkha Dungkhag (sub-district) was formally transferred from Sarpang Dzongkhag to Dagana Dzongkhag, affecting the town of Lhamozingkha and three gewogs – Lhamoizingkha, Deorali and Nichula Gewogs (Zinchula) – that formed the westernmost part of Sarpang and became the southernmost part of Dagana.

See also
Districts of Bhutan
Lhamoyzingkhar
Trongsa Province

References

 
Districts of Bhutan